Henry Harrison Culver (August 9, 1840 – September 27, 1897) was an American businessman and philanthropist. He is best known for founding the Culver Academies.

Early life
Henry Harrison Culver was born near London, Ohio on August 9, 1840. His father was John Milton and his mother, Lydia Howard Culver. He had five siblings.

Career
Culver started a cooking range company with two of his brothers, Walter and Licius, which they incorporated in 1881 as the Wrought Iron Range Company in St. Louis. The company was very successful and Culver amassed a substantial fortune. After becoming ill, he retired in 1883 to the north shore of Lake Maxinkuckee, close to his wife's childhood home.

Philanthropy
In 1894, Culver founded a college preparatory school on his property near Lake Maxinkuckee. It was modelled after West Point. It is now known as Culver Academies.

Personal life and death
Culver married Emily Hand. They had two sons, Edwin Raymond Culver Sr, (1872-1930) and Bertram Beach Culver Sr. (1875-1959). He died on September 27, 1897.

References

1840 births
1897 deaths
People from London, Ohio
19th-century American businesspeople
19th-century American philanthropists